The following article presents a summary of the 1992 football (soccer) season in Brazil, which was the 91st season of competitive football in the country.

Campeonato Brasileiro Série A

Second phase

Final

Flamengo declared as the Campeonato Brasileiro champions by aggregate score of 5-2.

Relegation
No club was relegated to the following year's second level.

Campeonato Brasileiro Série B

Semifinals

|}

Final

Paraná declared as the Campeonato Brasileiro Série B champions by aggregate score of 3-1.

Promotion
The three best placed teams in each one of the four groups in the first stage, which are Santa Cruz, Fortaleza, Ceará, Remo, Vitória, Desportiva, Criciúma, Coritiba, União São João, América-MG, Paraná and Grêmio, were promoted to the following year's first level.

Campeonato Brasileiro Série C

Final

Tuna Luso declared as the Campeonato Brasileiro Série C champions by aggregate score of 3-3.

Promotion
The winners of the seven groups of the first phase, Nacional-AM, Tuna Luso, Auto Esporte-PB, Fluminense de Feira, Rio Pardo, Matsubara and Operário-PR, would be promoted to 1993 Série B, but the Série B of that year was not held, so those promotions were not respected.

Copa do Brasil

The Copa do Brasil final was played between Internacional and Fluminense.

Internacional declared as the cup champions on the away goal rule by aggregate score of 2-2.

State championship champions

(1)Four clubs, which are Fortaleza, Ceará, Tiradentes-CE and Icasa, shared the 1992 Ceará State Championship title.

Youth competition champions

Other competition champions

Brazilian clubs in international competitions

Brazil national team
The following table lists all the games played by the Brazil national football team in official competitions and friendly matches during 1992.

Women's football

National team
The Brazil women's national football team did not play any matches in 1992.

References

 Brazilian competitions at RSSSF
 1992 Brazil national team matches at RSSSF
 1986-1996 Brazil women's national team matches at RSSSF

 
Seasons in Brazilian football
Brazil